Gia An 115 Hospital is a 367 bed private general hospital, owned by Hoa Lam Group, in Ho Chi Minh City. Gia An 115 Hospital is the second hospital in the Hoa Lam-Shangri-La Healthcare Techpark , next to City International Hospital. The location is in the south West of Ho Chi Minh City, on the gateway to Mekong Delta. Inaugurated in December 2018, the hospital was known as the first Public–private partnership hospital in Ho Chi Minh City, thanks to the agreement between Hoa Lam Corporation and People 115 Hospital, approved by the Central Government and People Committee of the City. 

Gia An 115 Hospital has 19 specialties in total, including emergency, anaesthesiology, cardiology, cardiothoracic surgery, dental & oral and maxillofacial surgery, ophthalmology, otorhinolaryngology, endocrinology, gastroenterology, general surgery, medical oncology, nuclear medicine, neurology, gynaecology, orthopedic surgery, physiotherapy, stroke,  renal medicine, respiratory and urology .

External links

See also
List of hospitals in Vietnam
City International Hospital, a sister hospital
Hospitals in Ho Chi Minh City
Municipal hospitals

References